Croftville is an unincorporated community in Cook County, Minnesota, United States.

The community is located three miles northeast of the city of Grand Marais on Minnesota Highway 61.

Highway 61 and County Road 87 (Croftville Road) are two of the main routes in the community.

History
Croftville, which thrived in the early 1900s, was first settled by Peter Olsen and brothers Charles and Joe Croft, from whom the community got its name.

Education
All of the county is zoned to Cook County ISD 166.

References

Unincorporated communities in Cook County, Minnesota
Unincorporated communities in Minnesota
Minnesota populated places on Lake Superior